Darrin Michael Pfeiffer (born 1969) is an American musician, record producer, band manager and radio personality. He has played drums in the pop punk bands Goldfinger, Sum 41, and The Salads.

Biography
Pfeiffer was born in Akron, New York. He began his music career in the mid 1980s, when, as a teen, he was a part of a thrash metal band called Beyond Death. The band's two other members went on to found the death metal band Cannibal Corpse in 1988.

In 1994, Pfeiffer became a founding member and drummer of Goldfinger. 
He married Vicky Anderson, the band's Canadian publicist, in 1998. (Anderson left Universal Music in 1998. The couple divorced in 2011).

In 2002, Pfeiffer moved from Los Angeles to his wife's hometown of Toronto where he eventually became a Canadian citizen. There, he started managing and producing punk bands. In 2005, Pfeiffer became an on-air host for 102.1 The Edge.
Late in 2005, the Pfeiffers started their own record label, High 4 Records. Their first signing was Crush Luther whose self-titled CD was released on 13 February 2007. The next band to sign, Cauterize released the CD, Disguises, on 12 June 2007. He has also played with the Canadian Rock Band, "The Salads".

Pfeiffer is a huge fan of Ice hockey and Figure skating, mainly the NHL teams Buffalo Sabres and The Los Angeles Kings. Darrin was lucky to have witnessed the Kings win the 2014 Stanley Cup on home ice and states Wayne Gretzky would be the only man he would ever sleep with. Pfeiffer has performed an acoustic love song/tribute to a life-sized cardboard cut out of Wayne Gretzky midway through a Goldfinger set.

Pfeiffer has released two solo albums under his alias "Dangerous Darrin". One is The Revenge...of Chicken McNuggets and the other, The Artist...Currently Known as Dangerous Darrin. They are no longer sold and very hard to come by these days.

In 2013 Pfeiffer moved back to Los Angeles where he works for the LA offices of Kill The 8 Merch Co and is also starting a record label there called Chart Attack Records launching in early 2016. Darrin also has a new radio show on the Idobi Radio Network called The Dangerous Darrin Show with his Buffalo NY friend TS. They feature guests from the world of Sports, music, pop culture & politics. TS left the show in July 2021 due to creative differences.

In May 2016, it was announced Goldfinger and Pfeiffer had parted ways due to interpersonal conflicts between lead singer John Feldmann and Pfeiffer, leaving Feldmann and Paulson as the only two original members of the group.

References

1969 births
Living people
American punk rock drummers
Goldfinger (band) members
Sum 41 members
Punk Rock Karaoke members